Associazione Sportiva Dilettantistica Luco Canistro was an Italian association football club located in Luco dei Marsi, Abruzzo and that represented also the town of Canistro, Abruzzo.

History 
Luco Canistro was founded in 1981.

In the summer 2007 the club has acquired the sport rights in order to play in Serie D from Avezzano.

In the summer 2012, after the relegation to Eccellenza, the club was dissolved.

Colors and badge 
Its colors were white and red.

References

External links
Official homepage

Football clubs in Abruzzo
Association football clubs established in 1981
1981 establishments in Italy
Association football clubs disestablished in 2012
2012 disestablishments in Italy